Acıbadem kurabiyesi is a traditional Turkish biscuit made of almonds, sugar and egg whites. The traditional recipes include a small amount of bitter almonds, which gives this cookie its name. However, because bitter almonds are not readily available, almond extract is typically used as a substitute. These biscuits are part of the stock-in trade of almost every bakery in Turkey, and are seldom made at home.

These biscuits have a chewy texture. They are usually served with coffee or ice cream. They are very similar to the traditional Italian amaretto cookie, which also calls for, and derives its name from, bitter almonds.

See also
 List of Turkish desserts
 Almond cookie
 Amaretti
 Ricciarelli
 Kurabiye
 Macarons d'Amiens
 List of almond dishes
 Amygdalota

References 

Biscuits
Turkish cuisine
Almond cookies